Robert Pflug (1 May 1832 – 30 November 1885) was a Baltic German architect.

Robert August Pflug was born in Saint Petersburg as the son of a merchant. He studied at the Technological Institute in Saint Petersburg between 1846 and 1850 and thereafter at the Imperial Academy of Arts. In 1860 he went on a study trip to Germany and Italy. From 1862 he worked as an architect in Riga, the present-day capital of Latvia, and was a teacher at the Riga Polytechnic Institute (today Riga Technical University) from 1869 to 1875.

Among the buildings designed by Pflug in Riga, the Nativity Cathedral, the House of the Livonian Noble Corporation (designed together with Jānis Frīdrihs Baumanis and Otto von Sievers; today the Latvian parliament, the Saeima) and the Haus Szczytt - House of Justynian Niemirowicz-Szczytt (1814-1894) - the building of the present-day Finnish embassy can be mentioned.

Gallery

References

Baltic-German people
Architects from Riga
Architects from Saint Petersburg
1832 births
1885 deaths
Academic staff of Riga Technical University